Saw Nyein Oo was the mother of King Alaungpaya, the founder of the Konbaung Dynasty of Burma (Myanmar). She was awarded the royal title "Maha Dewi" after her second son became king.

References

Bibliography
 

Konbaung dynasty